Tana Oy is a privately-owned, environmental technology company founded in 1971. Tana specializes in machines and equipment for mechanical processing of solid waste. The company manufactures landfill compactors and recycling machinery. Tana is a pioneer of using digital systems and artificial intelligence solutions in its equipment. Tana Oy's products have a distinctive black & yellow coloring.

Having competed for market share with large multinational corporations, Tana Oy has been able to differentiate itself and to win its customers’ trust by relying on these core values. In Finland, TANA landfill compactors have a 100 percent market share. TANA machines are exported to more than 50 countries through a global distribution network including over 30 authorized Tana distributors.  Majority of products manufactured by Tana Oy are being exported.

History 
 
The company's history dates back to the 1970s when Matti Sinkkonen established Tana-Jyrä Ltd. The company has also been known as Kone-Jyrä Ltd, Oy Tanacorp Ltd until in 2003 the current owner renamed the company Tana Ltd (Tana Oy).

Kone-Jyrä Ltd was known for the cancelled Iraq deal. In the late 1980s, the Iraqi government wanted to buy 16 motorboats from the company but due to the Gulf War, the deal was cancelled. A few of the boats were later used by the Finnish Society for the Saving of Shipwrecked Persons.

Origin of name 
The word 'Tana' comes from the Finnish word 'tanakka' which is used in the sense of something being robust, reliable and durable. It refers to the modular structure of the TANA machines and their longevity. A Finnish word for compacting, 'tanata', comes from the TANA landfill compactors and is nowadays used to describe crushing and compacting waste.

Offices and executive team

Headquarters 
Throughout its history, the company has had its headquarters in Jyväskylä, Finland. In 2015, the company headquarters was moved from Vaajakoski, Jyväskylä to the old Schauman castle in Lutakko, Jyväskylä. The Schauman Castle was originally built for the head of Schauman plywood factory owner Bruno Krook and his family. The castle was designed by Gunnar Wahlroos.

Offices 
Tana Oy's additional offices are; Tana Tampere Office in Technopolis Yliopistonrinne in Tampere, Finland, Tana Research & Development Centre in Jyväskylä, Finland and Tana Germany Office in Wiesbaden, Germany.

Executive team 
Kari Liuska, CEO

Teemu Lintula, VP, Services

Josef Imp, SVP, Business Development, Global Accounts

Kari Rautakoski, VP, Product Development

Jani Laurikainen, VP, Finance

Olli Heinonen, VP, Sales & Marketing

Acknowledgments 
Hallituspartnerit-network's Kultainen Nuija (golden gavel) Top 3 -finalist. Kultainen Nuija is an annual award given for one Finnish company, in recognition of excellence in governance.

Suomen Yrittäjät (Entrepreneurs of Finland) organization and insurance company Fennia awarded the 2021 National Entrepreneurship Award to the Chairman of the Board of Tana Oy, Kari Kangas, as well as to Dermoshop Oy, E. Hartikainen Oy, Heikkinen Yhtiöt Oy. The award is Finland's most prestigious award among entrepreneurs.

Tana Oy received the Kasvaja 2020 (Grower 2020) and Menestyjä 2020 (Achiever 2020) certificates issued by Kauppalehti for established operations, stable growth and good results and profitability.

The Central Finland Entrepreneur of the Year 2020 award was presented to the Chairman of the Board of Tana Oy, Kari Kangas.

In 2019, Suomalaisen Työn Liitto (Finnish Labor Union) awarded Tana Oy's products with the Avainlippu symbol (Key Flag Symbol).

Tana Oy was chosen in Business Finland's Sampo-campaign, and received a grant of 105,000 euros from Business Finland for the development of a new product development operating model. The Sampo-campaign wants to further develop the operations of the manufacturing industry. The campaign is aimed at companies of all sizes in the manufacturing industry.

References

External links 
 https://europorssi.com/fi/tana-oyn-jatteenkasittelykoneille-on-myonnetty-avainlippu/ | Tana Oy:n jätteenkäsittelykoneille on myönnetty Avainlippu | Viitattu 8.4.2020
 https://www.tana.fi/ | Tana's website | tana.fi | Viitattu 10.4.2017
 http://www.hs.fi/autot/art-2000002719806.html| Kaatopaikkajyrä on vaikuttava hirviö | Taskinen, Kimmo | hs.fi Helsingin Sanomat | 27.3.2014 | Viitattu 10.4.2017 |
 http://www.uusiouutiset.fi/tana-oy-kokoaa-tyomaatiedot/ | Tana Oy kokoaa työmaatiedot | uusiouutiset.fi |Uusiouutiset 16.6.2015 | Viitattu 10.4.2017
 Keski-Suomen maakunnan yhteistyöryhmän tiedotuslehti | http://www.keskisuomi.fi/vipuvoimaa/article.php?id=&selArticle=119  | "Tana jyräsi vanhat ajatukset" | keskisuomi.fi
 Keski-Suomen maakunnan yhteistyöryhmän tiedotuslehti 2/2011 | Viitattu 10.4.2017

Waste management companies of Finland
1970s establishments in Finland
Companies established in the 1970s